The 2020–21 Ukrainian Premier League Under-21 and Under-19 season are competitions between the youth teams of the Ukrainian Premier League. The competitions among under-21 teams were expanded due to expansion of the league as well as sanctions against Olimpik had expired. Also, Karpaty Lviv were expelled from the Ukrainian Premier League for no show in the previous season.

During the winter break, it was decided that for competitions among "under-21" teams this is the last season and all participating teams of clubs will be given chance to be converted to their clubs' second teams (reserve teams) playing in the football pyramid, predominantly the Second League. The top three will be granted with possibility to enter competition of the Ukrainian First League, however, it is subject to be approved in the next season regulations this summer.

Teams

Under-21 competition

Standings

Top scorers

Source: Ukrainian Premier League website

Under-19 competition

Top scorers

Source: Ukrainian Premier League website

See also
 2020–21 Ukrainian Premier League

References

Reserves
Ukrainian Premier Reserve League seasons